Micromonospora terminaliae is a bacterium from the genus Micromonospora which has been isolated from the stem of the plant Terminalia mucronata from Ubon Ratchathani, Thailand.

References

External links
Type strain of Micromonospora terminaliae at BacDive -  the Bacterial Diversity Metadatabase

 

Micromonosporaceae
Bacteria described in 2017